Favorinus blianus is a species of sea slug, an aeolid nudibranch in the family Facelinidae.

Description 
The maximum recorded length is 30 mm.

Distribution 
This species was described from Pembrokeshire, Wales where it is a scarce animal. It has also been reported from Norway, England, Denmark, and Galicia, NW Spain.

References

External links 

 Sea Slug Forum listing 
 Habitas.org.uk listing 
 WoRMS listing 

Facelinidae
Gastropods described in 1974